The U.S. Senate Environment and Public Works Subcommittee on Oversight is a subcommittee of the U.S. Senate Committee on Environment and Public Works.

Jurisdiction

According to the Committee's website:

Responsibility for oversight of agencies, departments, and programs within the jurisdiction of the full committee, and for conducting investigations within such jurisdiction

Members, 116th Congress

External links

See also

Environment of the United States
Environment and Public Works Oversight